The Rajya Sabha (meaning the "Council of States") is the upper house of the Parliament of India. Uttar Pradesh state elects 31 members and they are indirectly elected by the state legislators of Uttar Pradesh. Members are elected for six years and 1/3 of members are retired after every two years. The number of seats, allocated to the party, are determined by the number of seats a party possesses during nomination and the party nominates a member to be voted on. Elections within the state legislatures are held using Single transferable vote with proportional representation.

Current members (2022)

Keys:

Alphabetical list of all members from Uttar Pradesh
This is the term wise list of current and former Rajya Sabha members from Uttar Pradesh.
Source: Parliament of India (Rajya Sabha)

Notes

References

External links
Rajya Sabha homepage hosted by the Indian government
Rajya Sabha FAQ page hosted by the Indian government
Who's who list
State wise list

Uttar Pradesh
 
Uttar Pradesh politics-related lists